Pasithee , also known as , is a retrograde irregular satellite of Jupiter. It was discovered by a team of astronomers from the University of Hawaii led by Scott S. Sheppard in 2001, and given the temporary designation .

Pasithee is about 2 kilometres in diameter, and orbits Jupiter at an average distance of 23,307,000 km in 711.12 days, at an inclination of 166° to the ecliptic (164° to Jupiter's equator), in a retrograde direction and with an eccentricity of 0.3289.

It was named in August 2003 after Pasithee, one of the Charites, goddesses of charm, beauty, nature, human creativity and fertility, daughters of Zeus (Jupiter) by Eurynome. Pasithee, better known as Aglaea, is the spouse of Hypnos (Sleep) and presides over hallucinations and hallucinogens.

It belongs to the Carme group, made up of irregular retrograde moons orbiting Jupiter at a distance ranging between 23 and 24 Gm and at an inclination of about 165°.

References

Carme group
Moons of Jupiter
Discoveries by Scott S. Sheppard
Irregular satellites
20011211
Discoveries by David C. Jewitt
Discoveries by Jan Kleyna
Moons with a retrograde orbit